Artur Mikołajczewski (born 27 June 1990) is a Polish competitive rower.

He competed at the 2016 Summer Olympics in Rio de Janeiro, in the men's lightweight double sculls.

References

External links

1990 births
Living people
Polish male rowers
Olympic rowers of Poland
Rowers at the 2016 Summer Olympics
Rowers at the 2020 Summer Olympics
People from Inowrocław
Sportspeople from Kuyavian-Pomeranian Voivodeship
World Rowing Championships medalists for Poland